Craniomandibular osteopathy, also known as lion's jaw, is a developmental disease in dogs causing extensive bony changes in the mandible and skull.  In this disease, a cyclical resorption of normal bone and replacement by immature bone occurs along the inner and outer surfaces of the affected bones.  It usually occurs between the ages of 3 and 8 months.  Breeds most commonly affected include the West Highland White Terrier, Scottish Terrier, Cairn Terrier, and Boston Terrier.  It is rare in large-breed dogs, but it has been reported.  Symptoms include firm swelling of the jaw, drooling, pain, and difficulty eating.  

It is an inherited disease, especially in Westies, in which it has been recognized as an autosomal recessive trait.  Canine distemper has also been indicated as a possible cause, as has E. coli infection, which could be why it is seen occasionally in large-breed dogs.  Growth of lesions will usually stop around the age of one year, and possibly regress.  This timing coincides with the normal completion of endochondral bone growth and ossification.  If the disease is extensive, especially around the tympanic bulla (middle ear), then the prognosis is guarded.

A similar disease seen in young Bullmastiffs is known as calvarial hyperostotic syndrome.  It is also similar to human infantile cortical hyperostosis.  It is characterized by irregular, progressive bony proliferation and thickening of the cortical bone of the calvaria, which is part of the skull.  Asymmetry of the lesions may occur, which makes it different from craniomandibular osteopathy.  Symptoms include painful swelling of the skull, fever, and lymph node swelling.  In most cases it is self-limiting.

References
  

Dog musculoskeletal disorders